Count Our Numbers is an EP by Champion. It was released in 2002 on Bridge 9 Records.  Bridge 9 later released this EP with Come Out Swinging as the Time Slips Away album.

Track listing
"The Decline"
"Fourth Of July"
"Time Slips Away"
"Monument"
"One Sixteen"
"Is Anybody There (Alone In A Crowd)"

Champion (band) EPs
2002 EPs
Bridge 9 Records EPs